Sergeant Richard Boury (June 15, 1830 to July 5, 1914) was an American soldier who fought in the American Civil War. Boury received the country's highest award for bravery during combat, the Medal of Honor, for his action  in Charlottesville, Virginia on 5 March 1865. He was honored with the award on 26 March 1865.

Biography
Boury was born in Monroe County, Ohio on 15 July 1830. He enlisted into the 1st West Virginia Volunteer Cavalry at Wirt Courthouse in West Virginia.

He died on 5 July 1914 in West Virginia. His remains are interred at the Parkersburg Memorial Gardens.

Medal of Honor citation

See also

List of American Civil War Medal of Honor recipients: A–F

References

1830 births
1914 deaths
People of West Virginia in the American Civil War
Union Army officers
United States Army Medal of Honor recipients
American Civil War recipients of the Medal of Honor